Giovanni Agostino Perotti ( Vercelli 12 April 1769 – Venice 6 June 1855) was an Italian composer, conductor, teacher and writer.

Life 
Perotti studied music with his brother Giovanni Domenico and later in Bologna with Stanislao Mattei. In 1795 he was in Wien as a keyboard player and in 1798 he moved to London.

He returned in Italy in 1801 and settled in Venice where in 1811 he was appointed maestro in the Cappella Marciana, position that he held till the death in 1855.

Perotti was essentially a composer of sacred music.

Compositions

Sacred music 
Abele (orat, P. Metastasio), Bologna, 1794
La contadina nobile (comic op), Pisa, 1795, lost
Exultate Deo, 4vv, org (Venice, n.d.); 
125 sacred works for soloists, chorus and orch, including masses, mass sections, canticles, hymns, Lamentations, motets, ps settings, vespers (in I-Vsm, Vlevi) 
other sacred works and fugues (in D-Dlb) 
Mass, in collaboration with Pacini (in I-Li) 
16 fugues, Bc

Piano 
Sonata, 6 hands
Concerto, 4 hands
6 sonate, 4 hands
Sonata, 4 hands
Theme and Variations, 2, 4 hands
4 sonatas 
Variations on Diletta immagine 
other pieces

External links
 

1769 births
1855 deaths
19th-century classical composers
19th-century Italian composers
19th-century Italian male musicians
Italian classical composers
Italian male classical composers
Cappella Marciana composers
Cappella Marciana maestri
Musicians from Venice
People from Vercelli